Random Box (stylized in all caps) is the third extended play by South Korean rapper and producer, Zico. The EP was released on July 1, 2020, by KOZ Entertainment and Kakao M, in both digital and physical versions. The EP contains six tracks, including the previously released single "Any Song". On July 9, the Gaon Music Chart certified "Any Song" as platinum in streaming, and listed it as the most-streamed song in Korea for the first half of 2020. This is Zico's first EP under his production company, KOZ Entertainment; and his last EP before he enlisted in the South Korean army, as mandated.

Track listing

Charts

Sales

See also
Zico discography

References 

2020 EPs
Korean-language EPs